This page is a list of construction topics.

A
Abated
- Abrasive blasting
- AC power plugs and sockets
- Access mat
- Accrington brick
- Accropode
- Acid brick
- Acoustic plaster
- Active daylighting
- Adaptive reuse
- Aerial crane
- Aerosol paint
- Aggregate base
- Agile construction
- Akmon
- Alternative natural materials
- Anchorage in reinforced concrete
- Angle grinder
- Arc welding
- Artificial stone
- Asbestos cement
- Asbestos insulating board
- Asbestos shingle
- Asphalt concrete
- Asphalt roll roofing
- Autoclaved aerated concrete
- Autonomous building
- Azulejo
- Australian Construction Contracts
- Axe

B
Backhoe
- Balloon framing
- Bamboo construction
- Bamboo-mud wall
- Bandsaw
- Banksman
- Barrel roof
- Baseboard
- Basement waterproofing
- Batten
- Batter board
- Belt sander
- Bill of quantities
- Bioasphalt
- Biocidal natural building material
- Bituminous waterproofing
- Block paving
- Blowtorch
- Board roof
- Bochka roof
- Bond beam
- Boulder wall
- Bowen Construction
- Box crib
- Breaker
- Brettstapel
- Brick
- Brick clamp
- Brick hod
- Bricklayer
- Brickwork
- Bughole
- Builder's risk insurance
- Builders hardware
- Builders' rites
- Building
- Building automation
- Building code
- Building construction
- Building control body 
- Building cooperative
- Building design
- Building diagnostics
- Building engineer
- Building envelope
- Building estimator
- Building implosion
- Building information modeling
- Building information modeling in green building
- Building insulation
- Building insulation materials
- Building-integrated photovoltaics
- Building life cycle
- Building maintenance unit
- Building material
- Building officials
- Building performance
- Building performance simulation
- Building regulations approval
- Building regulations in the United Kingdom
- Building science 
- Building services engineering
- Building typology
- Bull's eye level
- Bulldozer
- Bundwerk
- Bush hammer
- Butterfly roof

C
Calcium aluminate cements
- Camber beam
- Carpenter's axe
- Carpentry
- Cast in place concrete
- Cast stone
- Caulk
- Cavity wall insulation
- Cellulose insulation
- Cement
- Cement board
- Cement-bonded wood fiber
- Cement clinker
- Cement kiln
- Cement mill
- Cement render
- Cement tile
- Cementing equipment
- Cementitious foam insulation
- Cenocell
- Central heating
- Centring
- Ceramic building material
- Ceramic tile cutter
- Chaska brick
- Chief Construction Adviser to UK Government
- Chimney
- Circular saw
- Civil engineer
- Civil engineering
- Civil estimator
- Cladding (construction)
- Clerk of the Works
- Climate-adaptive building shell
- Climbing formwork
- Clinker brick
- Close studding
- Coastal engineering
- Coating
- Cold-formed steel
- Collar beam
- Collyweston stone slate
- Compactor
- Complex Projects Contract
- Composite material
- Composting toilet
- Compressed earth block
- Computer-aided design
- Concrete
- Concrete degradation
- Concrete densifier
- Concrete finisher
- Concrete float
- Concrete fracture analysis
- Concrete grinder
- Concrete hinge
- Concrete leveling
- Concrete mixer
- Concrete masonry unit
- Concrete moisture meter
- Concrete plant
- Concrete pump
- Concrete recycling
- Concrete saw
- Concrete sealer
- Concrete ship
- Concrete slab
- Concrete slump test
- Conical roof
- Constructability
- Constructed wetland
- Constructing Excellence
- Construction
- Construction Alliance
- Construction and renovation fires
- Construction bidding
- Construction buyer
- Construction collaboration technology
- Construction communication
- Construction contract
- Construction delay
- Construction engineering
- Construction equipment theft
- Construction estimating software
- Construction foreman
- Construction industry of India
- Construction industry of Iran
- Construction industry of Japan
- Construction industry of Romania
- Construction industry of the United Kingdom
- Construction law
- Constructionline
- Construction loan
- Construction management
- Construction paper
- Construction partnering
- Construction Photography
- Construction Research and Innovation Strategy Panel
- Construction site safety
- Construction trailer
- Construction waste
- Construction worker
- Cool pavement
- Copper cladding
- Cordwood construction
- Core-and-veneer
- Corn construction
- Cornerstone
- Corrosion fatigue
- Corrugated galvanised iron
- Cost engineering
- Cost overrun
- Cover meter
- Crane
- Crane vessel
- Crawl space
- Crawler excavator
- Cream City brick
- Creep and shrinkage of concrete
- Cross bracing
- Cross-laminated timber
- Custom home
- Cutting tool

D
Damp proofing
- Deck
- Deconstruction
- Decorative concrete
- Decorative laminate
- Decorative stones
- Deep foundation
- Deep plan
- Demolition
- Demolition waste
- Design–bid–build
- Design–build
- Detailed engineering
- Diagrid
- Diamond grinding
- Diamond grinding of pavement
- Die grinder
- Dimensional lumber
- Directional boring
- Displacement ventilation
- Distribution board
- Dolos
- Domestic roof construction
- Double envelope house
- Double tee
- Dragon beam
- Drain (plumbing)
- Drainage
- Drifter drill
- Drill
- Drilling and blasting
- Driven to refusal
- Dropped ceiling
- Dry mortar production line
- Drywall
- Drywall mechanic
- Ducrete
- Dump truck
- Dumper
- Duplex
- Dutch brick
- Dutch gable roof
- Dutch roof tiles
- Dwang

E
Early skyscrapers
- Earthbag construction
- Earthquake engineering
- Earthquake-resistant structures
- Earthquake simulation
- Eco-cement
- Egyptian pyramid construction techniques
- Electrical engineer
- Electrical wiring
- Electrician
- Electric resistance welding
- Elemental cost planning
- Elevator mechanic
- Encasement
- Encaustic tile
- Endurance time method
- Energetically modified cement
- Engineering
- Engineered cementitious composite
- Engineering brick
- Engineering, procurement, and construction
- Enviroboard
- Environmental impact of concrete
- Equivalent Concrete Performance Concept
- Erosion control
- Eternit
- Excavator
- Expanded clay aggregate
- Expanded polystyrene concrete
- External render
- Exterior insulation finishing system
- External wall insulation

F
Falsework
- Facade
- Facade engineering
- Facadism
- Facility condition assessment
- Fareham red brick
- Fast-track construction
- Fastener
- Faux painting
- Fédération Française du Bâtiment
- Ferrocement
- Fiberboard
- Fiber cement siding
- Fiberglass
- Fiberglass sheet laminating
- Fiber-reinforced composite
- Fiber-reinforced concrete
- Fiber roll
- Fibre cement
- Fibre-reinforced plastic
- Filigree concrete
- Fill trestle
- Fire brick
- Fire door
- Fire protection (Active fire protection / Passive fire protection) 
- Fire Protection Engineering
- Firestopping
- Fireproofing
- Fire safety
- Fire sprinkler system
- First fix and second fix
- Flashing
- Flat roof
- Floating raft system
- Floor plan
- Flux-cored arc welding
- Fly ash brick
- Foam concrete
- Foam glass
- Forge welding
- Formstone
- Formwork
- Foundation
- Framer
- Framing
- Frost damage
- Furring

G
Gable roof
- Gambrel
- Gas metal arc welding
- Geofoam
- Geologic preliminary investigation
- GigaCrete
- Girt
- Glass brick
- Glass fiber reinforced concrete
- Glazier
- Glazing
- Glued laminated timber
- Grade beam
- Grader
- Grating
- Green building
- Green building and wood
- Green building in Germany
- Green (certification)
- Green roof
- Green wall
- Groundbreaking
- Ground reinforcement
- Grout
- Grouted roof
- Guastavino tile
- Gypsum block
- Gypsum concrete

H
Hammer
- Hammerbeam roof
- Hammer drill
- Hard hat
- Harling
- Harvard brick
- Heat pump
- Heavy equipment
- Heavy equipment operator
- Hempcrete
- Herodotus Machine
- Herringbone pattern
- High-performance fiber-reinforced cementitious composites
- High-rise building
- High-visibility clothing
- History of construction
- History of structural engineering
- History of the world's tallest buildings
- Heating, ventilation, and air-conditioning
- Hoisting
- Home construction
- Home improvement
- Home wiring
- Hot-melt adhesive
- House
- House painter and decorator
- House raising
- Housewrap
- Hurricane-proof building
- Hybrid masonry
- Hydrodemolition
- Hydrophobic concrete
- Hypertufa

I
I-beam
- I-joist
- Iberian paleochristian decorated tile 
- Illegal construction
- Imbrex and tegula
- Impact wrench
- Imperial roof decoration
- Industrialization of construction
- Insulated glazing
- Insulated siding
- Insulating concrete form
- Insulation materials
- Integrated framing assembly
- Integrated project delivery
- Interior protection
- International Building Code
- Ironworker

J
Jackhammer
- Jack post
- Japanese carpentry
- Jettying
- Jigsaw
- Joinery
- Joint
- Joint compound
- Johnson bar

K
Knee wall
- Knockdown texture

L
Laborer
- Ladder
- Lakhori bricks
- Laminate panel
- Lath and plaster
- Laser level
- Launching gantry
- Lean construction
- Level luffing crane
- Lewis (lifting appliance)
- Lift slab construction
- Lifting equipment
- Lighting
- Light tower
- Lightening holes
- Lime mortar
- Line of thrust
- Live bottom trailer
- Living building material
- Load-bearing wall
- Loader
- Log building
- London stock brick
- Low-energy building techniques
- Low-energy house
- Low-rise building
- Lump sum contract
- Lunarcrete
- Lustron house

M
Mansard roof
- Marbleizing
- Masonry
- Masonry trowel
- Masonry veneer
- Mass concrete
- Master builder
- Material efficiency
- Material passport
- Mathematical tile
- Mechanical connections
- Mechanical, electrical, and plumbing
- Mechanics lien
- Medieval letter tile
- Medium-density fibreboard
- Megaproject
- Megastructure
- Metal profiles
- Microtunneling
- Middle-third rule
- Miller Act
- Millwork
- Millwright
- Mobile crane
- Modular addition
- Modular building
- Moiré tell-tale
- Moling
- Moment-resisting frame
- Monocrete construction
- Mono-pitched roof
- Mortar
- Mudbrick
- Mudcrete
- Multi-tool

N
Nail gun
- Nanak Shahi bricks
- Nanoconcrete
- NEC Engineering and Construction Contract
- New Austrian tunnelling method
- New-construction building commissioning
- Nibbler
- Non-shrink grout

O
Occupancy
- Offshore construction
- Off-site construction
- Operational bill
- Opus africanum
- Opus albarium
- Opus craticum
- Opus gallicum
- Opus incertum
- Opus isodomum
- Opus latericium
- Opus mixtum
- Opus quadratum
- Opus reticulatum
- Opus spicatum
- Opus vittatum
- Oriented strand board
- Oxy-fuel welding and cutting

P
Painter and decorator
- Painterwork
- Panelling
- Pantile
- Papercrete
- Parge coat
- Particle board
- Passive daylighting
- Passive house
- Passive survivability
- Pavement
- Pavement engineering
- Pavement milling
- Paver base
- Penetrant (mechanical, electrical, or structural)
- Performance bond
- Permeable paving
- Pierrotage
- Pile cap
- Pile driver
- Pile splice
- Pipefitter
- Pipelayer
- Planetary surface construction
- Plank (wood)
- Planning permission
- Planning permission in the United Kingdom
- Plasma arc welding
- Plasterer 
- Plasterwork
- Plastic lumber
- Plot plan
- Plug and feather
- Plumb bob
- Plumber
- Plumbing
- Plumbing drawing
- Pneumatic tool
- Pole building framing
- Polished concrete
- Polychrome brickwork
- Polymer concrete
- Porch collapse
- Portable building
- Portland cement
- Portland stone
- Portuguese pavement
- Post in ground
- Poteaux-sur-sol
- Powder coating
- Power concrete screed
- Power shovel
- Power tool
- Power trowel
- Precast concrete
- Pre-construction services
- Pre-engineered building
- Prefabricated building
- Prefabrication
- Prestressed concrete
- Prestressed structure
- Primer (paint)
- Project agreement (Canada)
- Project delivery method
- Project management
- Properties of concrete
- Punch list
- Purlin

Q
Quadruple glazing
- Quantity surveyor
- Quantity take-off
- Quarry tile
- Quarter minus

R
R-value (insulation)
- Radial arm saw
- Radiant barrier
- Radiator reflector
- Rafter
- Rainscreen
- Raised floor
- RAL colour standard
- RAL colors
- Rammed earth
- Random orbital sander
- Rapid construction
- Ready-mix concrete
- Real estate
- Rebar
- Rebar detailing
- Rebar spacer
- Reciprocal frame
- Reciprocating saw
- Red List building materials
- Red rosin paper
- Redevelopment
- Reed mat (plastering)
- Reema construction
- Reglet
- Reinforced concrete
- Reinforced concrete structures durability
- Relocatable buildings
- Repointing
- Resilience (engineering and construction)
- Retentions in the British construction industry
- Rice-hull bagwall construction
- Rigger
- Rigid panel
- Ring crane
- Rivet gun
- Road
- Road surface
- Roller-compacted concrete
- Roman cement
- Roof
- Roof coating
- Roof edge protection
- Roofer
- Roof shingle
- Roof tiles
- Room air distribution
- Rosendale cement
- Rotary hammer
- Roughcast
- Rubberized asphalt
- Rubble
- Rubble trench foundation
- Rubblization
- Ruin value

S
Saddle roof
- Salt-concrete
- Saltillo tile
- Sander
- Sandhog
- Sandjacking
- Sandwich panel
- Sarking
- Saw-tooth roof
- Sawyer
- Scabbling
- Scaffolding
- Schmidt hammer
- Screed
- Screw piles
- Scrim and sarking
- Sediment control
- Segregation in concrete
- Self-build
- Self-cleaning floor
- Self-consolidating concrete
- Self-framing metal buildings
- Self-leveling concrete
- Septic tank
- Serviceability
- Sett
- Settlement (structural)
- Sewage treatment
- Shallow foundation
- Shear
- Shear wall
- Sheet metal
- Shelf angle
- Shielded metal arc welding
- Shiplap
- Shop drawing
- Shoring
- Shotcrete
- Shovel
- Shovel ready
- Sick building syndrome
- Siding
- Sill plate
- Site survey
- Skyscraper
- Skyscraper design and construction
- Slate industry in Wales
- Slater
- Sledgehammer
- Slipform stonemasonry
- Slip forming
- Smalley
- Snecked masonry
- Soft story building
- Soil cement
- Solid ground floor
- Sorel cement
- Spackling paste
- Spirit level
- Split-level home
- Spray painting
- Stack effect
- Staff
- Staffordshire blue brick
- Staggered truss system
- Staircase jig
- Stair tread
- Stairs
- Stamped asphalt
- Stamped concrete
- Steam shovel
- Steeplejack
- Sticky rice mortar
- Stonemason's hammer
- Storey pole 
- Storm drain
- Storm window
- Steel building
- Steel fixer
- Steel frame
- Steel plate construction
- Stone carving
- Stone sealer
- Stone veneer
- Storey
- Strand jack
- Strap footing
- Straw-bale construction
- Strength of materials
- Strongback
- Structural building components
- Structural channel
- Structural clay tile
- Structural drawing
- Structural engineering
- Structural insulated panel
- Structural integrity and failure
- Structural material
- Structural robustness
- Structural steel
- Structure relocation
- Strut channel
- Stucco
- Submerged arc welding
- Submittals
- Subsidence
- Substructure
- Suction excavator
- Suicide bidding
- Sulfur concrete
- Superadobe
- Superinsulation
- Superintendent
- Surfaced block
- Survey stakes
- Sustainability in construction
- Sustainable flooring
- Sustainable refurbishment

T
T-beam
- Tabby concrete
- Table saw
- Tar paper
- Teardown
- Telescopic handler
- Temperley transporter
- Temporary fencing
- Tented roof
- Terraced house
- Tetrapod
- Textile-reinforced concrete
- Thatching
- Thermal bridge
- Thermal insulation
- Thinset
- Thin-shell structure
- Three-decker
- Tie
- Tie down hardware
- Tile
- Tilt slab
- Tilt up
- Timber
- Timber framing
- Timber framing tools
- Timber pilings
- Timber recycling
- Timber roof truss
- Tin ceiling
- Tiocem
- Toe board
- Topping out
- Townhouse
- Tracked loader
- Traditional Korean roof construction
- Transite
- Treadwheel crane
- Trench shield
- Trencher
- Trenchless technology
- Truss
- Tube and clamp scaffold
- Tuckpointing
- Tunnel boring machine
- Tunnel construction
- Tunnel hole-through
- Tunnel rock recycling
- Twig work
- Types of concrete

U
Umarell
- Uncertainties in building design and building energy assessment
- Underfloor air distribution
- Underground construction
- Underpinning
- Unfinished building
- Uniclass
- Uniformat

V
Verify in field
- Vertical damp proof barrier
- Vibro stone column
- Vinyl composition tile
- Vinyl siding
- Virtual design and construction
- Vitrified tile
- Voided biaxial slab
- Volumetric concrete mixer

W
Waffle slab
- Walking excavator
- Wall
- Wall chaser
- Wall footing
- Wall plan
- Wall stud
- Water–cement ratio
- Water heating
- Water level
- Waterproofing
- Wattle and daub
- Wearing course
- Weathering steel
- Weatherization
- Weld access hole
- Welded wire mesh
- Welder
- Welding
- Welding power supply
- Wheel tractor-scraper
- White Card
- Window capping
- Window insulation film
- Window well cover
- Wiring closet
- Wood-plastic composite
- Wood shingle
- Wool insulation
- Wrecking ball
- Wrought iron

X
Xbloc

Y

Z
Zellij
- Zero-energy building
- Zome

See also
 Outline of construction
 Glossary of British bricklaying
 Glossary of construction cost estimating
 List of building materials
 List of building types
 List of buildings 
 List of construction methods
 List of construction trades
 List of roof shapes

Construction topics